The Battle of Samothrace was an inconclusive battle which took place on 20 September 1698 near the island of Samothrace, during the Sixth Ottoman–Venetian War. It was fought between Venice on one side, and the Ottoman Empire with its Tripolitanian, Egyptian, and Tunisian vassals on the other. Venetian casualties were 299 killed and 622 wounded. Although it resulted in a stalemate, the Battle of Samothrace is notable as being the last significant battle of the Great Turkish War.

Opposing forces

Venice 
Rizzo d'Oro - Damaged
Amazzone Guerriera
Aquila Valiera c.70
San Lorenzo Giustinian c.70
16 other ships

Ottomans 
25 Ottoman ships
8 Tripolitanian and Tunisian vessels
4 Egyptian vessels

References 
 

Conflicts in 1698
1698 in Europe
Battles of the Great Turkish War
Naval battles of the Ottoman–Venetian Wars
History of Samothrace
17th century in Greece
1690s in the Ottoman Empire
Samothrace
Samothrace